Windowpane & The Snow was a CD released by the band Coil. This release compiles the two EPs, "Windowpane" and "The Snow". The original versions of the songs "Windowpane" and "The Snow" appear on the album Love's Secret Domain.

Background
"The Snow (As Pure As?)" remix is credited to John Balance and Drew McDowall. "The Snow (Driftmix)" and "The Snow (Out in the Cold)" remixes are by Peter Christopherson. "The Snow (Answers Come in Dreams I)" and "The Snow (Answers Come in Dreams II)" were remixed by Jack Dangers, also known as Meat Beat Manifesto, and are something of a departure for Coil, expressing a rather more mainstream Acid House feel. These two remixes frequently repeat a sample of the introductory elephants from Jean-Michel Jarre's Zoolook album, and prominently feature a house-style bass organ and breakbeat.

Danny Hyde and Stephen Thrower are also credited on the sleeve notes.

Track listing
 "Windowpane (Minimal Mix)" - 5:38
 "Windowpane" - 5:48
 "Windowpane (Astral Paddington Mix)" - 5:39
 "The Snow (Driftmix)" - 2:34
 "The Snow (Answers Come in Dreams I)" - 5:50
 "The Snow (Out in the Cold)" - 7:50
 "The Snow (As Pure As?)" - 6:42
 "The Snow (Answers Come in Dreams II)" - 5:56
 "The Snow" - 6:43

References

External links
 
 
 Windowpane & the Snow at Brainwashed

1995 compilation albums
Coil (band) compilation albums